The   Cruzados  were a 1980s rock band from Los Angeles, California.

History
The Cruzados were formed in 1983 by the members of The Plugz, featuring members Tito Larriva, Tony Marsico, Steven Hufsteter, Chalo Quintana, 

The band's self-titled album on Arista Records, Cruzados, was released in 1985 as well as their second album After Dark in 1987. 

The Cruzados also performed the song "Don't Throw Stones" in the 1989 movie Road House. In 2021 the Cruzados released their third studio album “She’s Automatic”

Tito Larriva performs with his band Tito & Tarantula and are best known for their appearance in the film “From Dusk Till Dawn”. Steven Hufsteter performed with his band Shrine” as well as with Tito & Tarantula.
Quintana played drums for Bob Dylan, Izzy Stradlin & the JuJu Hounds]] and  Social Distortion. Quintana died in 2018.  Marsico became bassist for Bob Dylan, Matthew Sweet, Neil Young, Roger Daltrey and Marianne Faithfull. Rohner became guitarist for the band T.S.O.L. but died in October 2005.               
In 2020, bassist Tony Marsico restarted the Cruzados and released a new album with members Ron Young, Loren Molinare, Mark Tremalgia and Rob Klonel.

Covers
Jenny Morris included a cover of the Cruzados song "Rising Sun" on her 1987 album, Body and Soul.

Personnel

Discography

External links
Social Distortion: Drummer Chalo Quintana from themusicedge.com

 VH1.com listing for the Cruzados

Musical groups from Los Angeles
Musical groups established in 1984
Musical groups disestablished in 1988
1984 establishments in California
1988 disestablishments in California
Rock music groups from California